Cree Lake is a lake in Saskatchewan, Canada. The lake is the fourth largest in the province and is located west of Reindeer Lake and south of Lake Athabasca.  There is no highway access, but the lake is reachable by float plane.

Cree Lake (Crystal Lodge) Airport (bush strip) and Cree Lake (Crystal Lodge) Water Aerodrome serve Crystal Lodge, a fly-in fishing lodge.

Cree Lake settlements
A Dene settlement with an airport was located on the south-west shore of the lake (at coordinates 
). It may have been the location of a Hudson's Bay Company trading post from 1891 to 1902. In 1971 there were 36 residents (22 were First Nations). 
Another settlement was located at the north-east end of the lake near the Cree River outflow. In the 1960s it had an airport, a small log church and numerous houses (near co-ordinates ).  A fish plant on Turner Island was built in 1957 by Waite Fisheries and is located at co-ordinates .

Other locations on Cree Lake with populations in the 1970s were the Cree Lake Weather Station in the south-west at the entrance to Cable Bay and airfield (with 10 people) operated by the Canadian Government, the Cree Lake D.N.S. Radio Station (Department of Northern Saskatchewan) on Turner Island (with 10 people) and a camp at the north-end (with 15 people).

Although officially named Cree Lake in 1938  the lake lies in the traditional territory of the Dene and the English River Dene Nation based in Patuanak has reserves at three sites on the lake.

Fish species
Fish species include walleye, yellow perch, northern pike, lake trout, lake whitefish, cisco, burbot, Arctic grayling, white sucker and longnose sucker.

Islands
The lake has several named and unnamed islands. Some of the named islands include:
Auriat Island
Cowie Island
Dahl Island
Davies Island
Dixon Island (Saskatchewan)
Fleming Island (Saskatchewan)
Ispatinow Island - (containing Cree Lake (Crystal Lodge) Airport and Crystal Lodge) 
Johns Island (Saskatchewan)
Keeping Island
Laurier Island
Pelletier Island
Prowse Island
Ring Island
Rogers Island (Saskatchewan)
Turner Island (Saskatchewan)

See also
List of lakes in Saskatchewan

References

External links

Fish Species of Saskatchewan

Lakes of Saskatchewan
Hudson's Bay Company trading posts